Bythiospeum articense is a species of very small freshwater snails that have an operculum, aquatic gastropod mollusks in the family Hydrobiidae.

This species is  endemic to France.

References

Hydrobiidae
Bythiospeum
Endemic molluscs of Metropolitan France
Gastropods described in 1985
Taxonomy articles created by Polbot